Bilibinskite is an Au - Cu - Pb telluride. It is a rare mineral that was named after Soviet geologist Yuri Bilibin (1901–1952), who researched the geology of gold deposits during the time of the USSR.

Properties
Bilibinskite is a metallic mineral with a color that ranges from opaque bronze-colored to light-brown or brownish-pink. It has a sub-metallic luster, a brown streak color and has no fission. Bilibinskite crystallizes in the cubic system. It has a high relative density of 14.27. The mineral has a hardness of 4.5 to 5 and it is not radioactive.

Occurrence
Bilibinskite is a very rare mineral that formed in the weathering zones of gold tellurides. The type locality is the Kamchatka Peninsula in the Russian Far East, where the mineral was discovered in 1978. It has also been found in hypogene ores of Kazakhstan, Xinjiang and Tuva.

See also
List of minerals named after people

References

Copper minerals
Gold minerals
Lead minerals
Cubic minerals
Telluride minerals
Minerals described in 1978